Hymenoxys grandiflora is a North American species of flowering plant in the daisy family known by the common names graylocks four-nerve daisy, graylocks rubberweed, or old man of the mountain. It is native to high elevations in the Rocky Mountains of the western United States.

Description
H. grandiflora is a perennial herb up to 30 centimeters (1 foot) tall. The plant generally produces one flower head per stem, up to 10 per plant, present between June and August. Each head has 15–44 ray flowers and 150–400 disc flowers. The seeds are five-sided with narrow scales at the tip.

The species has the largest flowers of any in its genus, hence the specific epithet grandiflora (large-flowered).

Distribution and habitat
The plant is native to high elevations in the Rocky Mountains of the western United States, in the states of Montana, Idaho, Wyoming, Utah, Colorado, and New Mexico. It can be found on rocky slopes, meadows, and tundra environments.

References

External links

grandiflora
Flora of Colorado
Flora of the Western United States
Flora of the Rocky Mountains
Plants described in 1845
Flora without expected TNC conservation status